Elections were held in West Virginia on November 2, 2010.  Primary elections took place on May 11, 2010.

Federal

United States Senate 

The 2010 United States Senate special election in West Virginia will be held November 2, 2010, as incumbent Democratic U.S. Senator Robert C. Byrd died in office on June 28, 2010. The winner of this special election would serve the remainder of the term ending January 3, 2013. The special primary election will be held August 28.

State law allowed Governor Joe Manchin to make a temporary appointment to the vacant seat. Manchin named 36-year-old Carte Goodwin, a fellow Democrat, an attorney, and former Manchin aide. Goodwin was sworn in on July 20, 2010. Hours later, Manchin announced his intention to seek Byrd's Senate seat in the special election.

United States House 

All three of West Virginia's seats in the United States House of Representatives will be up for election in 2010.  All three incumbents will be running for re-election.

State 
State officers, including Governor, Secretary of State, Attorney General, Treasurer and Auditor are not up for election in 2010.

State Senate 
Seventeen seats, one from each district, of the West Virginia Senate will be up for election in 2010.
 West Virginia State Senate elections, 2010 at Ballotpedia

State House of Delegates 
All one hundred seats in the West Virginia House of Delegates are up for election in 2010.
 West Virginia House of Delegates elections, 2010 at Ballotpedia

Judicial positions 
Multiple judicial positions will be up for election in 2010.
 West Virginia judicial elections, 2010 at Judgepedia

Ballot measures 
No statewide measures were certified, although two were proposed and failed:
 Would allow counties to give new businesses a tax break
 Ban on marriage for same-sex couples

 West Virginia 2010 ballot measures at Ballotpedia

County 
Each county will elect at least one County Commissioner, a County Clerk, a Circuit Clerk, and three members of its County Board of Education.  Berkeley & Jefferson County will each elect two Commissioners.  In addition, five Commissioners for the Greater Huntington Park & Recreation District will be elected from Cabell County.

Political Party 
In West Virginia's primary on May 5, voters elected members of the State Executive Committee, District Executive Committees, and County Executive Committees for the Democratic and Republican parties.

References

External links 
 Elections from the West Virginia Secretary of State
 Candidates for West Virginia State Offices at Project Vote Smart
 West Virginia Polls at Pollster.com

 West Virginia Congressional Races in 2010 campaign finance data from OpenSecrets
 West Virginia 2010 campaign finance data from Follow the Money
 Imagine Election - Find out which candidates will appear on your ballot - search by address or zip code.

 
West Virginia